This is a list of DC Comics reprint collections including trade paperbacks, hardcovers, and other special format collections.

Major lines
Volumes released as a part of these lines are not included in the list below.
DC Archive Editions
DC Chronicles
DC Comics Absolute Edition
DC Omnibus
Showcase Presents

DC Deluxe Editions
DC Deluxe Editions are an oversized hardcover comic reprint format from DC Comics. The books feature the same dimensions as the company's Omnibus line (~7.5" x 11"), although typically with fewer pages per volume. Like the Omnibus line, Deluxe Editions are printed in full color, on high quality paper stock and include multiple comics per volume. Deluxe Editions typically feature shorter runs of comics, including one-off stories that would not support a larger omnibus collection, though in some cases, material originally collected in Deluxe Editions has also been collected into Omnibuses.

General collections

0–9

A

B

C

D

E

F

G

H

I

J

K

L

M

N

O

P

Q

R

S

T

V

W

Y

References 

Reprint collections
Comic book collection books